U.S. Route 92 or U.S. Highway 92 (US 92) is a 181-mile (291 km.) U.S. Route entirely in the U.S. state of Florida. The western terminus is at  US 19 Alt. and SR 687 in downtown St. Petersburg. The eastern terminus is at SR A1A in Daytona Beach.

Like all AASHTO designated highways in Florida, US 92 always carries a FDOT designated hidden state road number:
State Road 687 from the US route's western terminus at US 19 Alt/SR 595 to the junction with SR 686/SR 687/SR 694 in St. Petersburg.
State Road 600 from the junction with SR 686/SR 687/SR 694 in St. Petersburg to George Jenkins Boulevard in Lakeland, and again from East Gary Road in Lakeland to the route's eastern terminus at State Road A1A in Daytona Beach.
State Road 517 from George Jenkins Boulevard (SR 600 east) to Memorial Boulevard (SR 546 west) in Lakeland.
State Road 546 from Memorial Boulevard to East Gary Road (SR 600 west) in Lakeland.

Route description
US 92 is concurrent with SR 687 from downtown St. Petersburg to SR 600, SR 686 and SR 694 at the west end of the Gandy Causeway; unsigned SR 600 from the west end of the Gandy Causeway to west of downtown Lakeland; unsigned State Road 517 west of downtown Lakeland; SR 546 from west of downtown Lakeland to east of downtown Lakeland; and unsigned State Road 600 from east of downtown Lakeland to Daytona Beach.

Tampa Bay Area
US 92 begins along State Road 687 at the intersection of SR 595 in St. Petersburg. The road continues north along SR 687 until it reaches the eastern termini of State Roads 686 and 694, where it turns right on Gandy Boulevard (State Road 600) before crossing the Gandy Bridge into Tampa. After crossing the Gandy Bridge, US 92 intersects West Shore Boulevard and runs east along Gandy Boulevard until it reaches Dale Mabry Highway at the first interchange with the Lee Roy Selmon Expressway where it turns north. State Road 685 branches to the northeast at Henderson Boulevard. The next major intersections are Kennedy Boulevard (SR 60), then Interstate 275 at Exits 41 A. In between SR 616 and SR 574, US 92 passes George M. Steinbrenner Field and Raymond James Stadium. A parclo interchange with Hillsborough Avenue takes US 92 from Dale Mabry to Hillsborough Avenue and State Road 580 from Hillsborough Avenue to Dale Mabry Highway. US 92 crosses two parallel bridges over the Hillsborough River, then intersects with BUS US 41, I-275 again at Exits 47 A-B, then intersects northbound U.S. Route 41 and SR 45, where US 41 and 92 overlap each other. One other major intersection exists with SR 585 before US 41 turns southbound as the concurrency ends. 

After SR 583, the road becomes part of the collective-distributor roads along Interstate 4 west and east of the parclo interchange with U.S. Route 301 at Exit 7. The east end of the interchange contains a stub for a proposed west-to-northbound ramp to 301 at the westbound flyover. Access to Interstate 75 is only available eastbound from I-4. Three other local roads that cross US 92 access I-4. These consist of Mango Road in Mango, followed by McIntosh Road and Branch Forbes Road in Dover. Within Plant City US 92 appeoaches the southern terminus of State Road 566 (Thonotosassa Road) then splits into a one-way pair. The first major intersection along this one-way pair is Florida State Road 39 (Alexander Road), followed by Florida State Road 574, but only along the eastbound lanes. In downtown Plant City, US 92 encounters SR 39A which it has a two-block overlap between Wheeler and Collins Streets. After the one-way pair ends, the last state highway to intersect the route in the city and Hillsborough County is the southern terminus of State Road 533 (Park Road). East of SR 533, the road encounters a random series of level crossings for freight spurs leading from the CSX Lakeland Subdivision.

Polk County vicinity
As the road crosses the Hillsborough-Polk County Line from Youmans, it passes a historic stone marker on the southwest corner of County Line Road. It also passes by a former truck weigh station, and then runs beneath Florida State Road 570 (Polk Parkway) with no direct access. After the intersection with Florida State Road 572, it passes by the Silver Moon Drive-In in the former unincorporated community of Winston. Entering the city of Lakeland, Florida, US 92 approaches the intersection with Wabash Avenue (hidden Florida State Road 517) and makes a brief turn to the north, while SR 600 continues eastbound unmarked along George Jenkins Boulevard (former US Business Route 92). The route turns east again at the intersection with Florida State Road 546, and overlaps that route through the rest of the city. US 92/SR 546 continues eastbound along Memorial Boulevard where it climbs a bridge over the CSX Vitis Subdivision and Florida State Road 539 with no access. Roughly 16 blocks later, the two routes approach U.S. Route 98, and is joined by hidden Florida State Road 700. Three blocks later, it intersects the southern terminus of Florida State Road 33. SR 700 leaves the route at North Lake Parker Avenue, while US 92/FL 546 rides along the southern bank of Lake Parker, until the intersection of East Gary Road, where SR 546 comes to an end and hidden SR 600 rejoins the route.

On the border between Crystal Lake, Florida and Combee Settlement, Florida US 92/SR 600 encounters the intersection with Florida State Road 659. Later it enters more rural surroundings as it enters Fussels Corner, Florida and briefly runs directly along the north side of the Lakeland Subdivision, then moves away from the tracks as it enters Auburndale, Florida, where the route encounters the Polk Parkway again, but this time at an interchange. Serving as a commercial strip beyond this point, the route encounters the southern terminus of County Road 655 (Polk County, Florida), and three blocks later the northern terminus of Florida State Road 655. The road curves northeast where it barely runs along the southeast coast of Lake Lena, then curves to the southeast at Bridgers Avenue, a former alignment of US 92. From there it runs along a bridge that passes over a railroad junction between the CSX Lakeland Subdivision, Auburndale Subdivision, Carters Subdivision and a freight spur leading between the northeast coast of Lake Lena, and southwest coast of Lake Ariana. As the route descends from the bridge, the street name changes to Magnolia Avenue and five blocks later, encounters the intersection of Florida State Road 559 (Main Street). Across from the south side of Auburndale Cemetery the western terminus of Florida State Road 544 branches off to the southeast towards Legoland (formerly Cypress Gardens) and part of Haines City. In the meantime, US 92 curves back to the northeast where it briefly enters a northwestern portion of Winter Haven, encounters the eastern end of Bridgers Avenue, and serves as the location for Winter Haven Regional Airport (a.k.a.; Gilbert's Field).

US 92 and U.S. Highway 17 join at the south end of Lake Alfred. State Road 600 continues to carry US 92 from Auburndale, while State Road 555 takes US 17 from the south via Winter Haven. County Road 555 soon splits to the north along the old road through Lake Alfred, while US 17/92 runs to the northeast on Lake Shore Way. The routes become a one-way pair between Echo Street and Seminole Way, but before that pair ends, County Road 557 begins at Polemo Street, where it heads west for a block to CR 555, and then turns north towards Interstate 4; just past CR 557, US 17/92 turns east towards Haines City. It enters downtown Haines City on Hinson Avenue after crossing under U.S. Highway 27 at a cloverleaf, meeting the north end of State Road 17 (formerly US Alt 27) before turning north on 17th Street. It soon meets County Road 580, which runs east to Poinciana. In Davenport, US 92 meets County Road 547, which heads west to U.S. Highway 27 and north along old US 17/92. US 92 then intersects with Ronald Reagan Parkway (County Road 54) at Loughman.

Orlando area

Entering Osceola County, US 92 picks up the Orange Blossom Trail name. Orange Blossom Trail (OBT) takes US 92 east and north through Kissimmee and into Orlando. The OBT name temporarily ends at Pleasant Hill Road (former State Road 531) in southern Kissimmee, where US 92 uses John Young Parkway (formerly Bermuda Avenue) to Vine Street (U.S. Highway 192/SR 530). (US 92 ran through downtown Kissimmee on Emmett Street, Broadway and Main Street until ca. 2000.) It turns east there on US 192, turning north at Main Street, which becomes OBT at the north city limits. U.S. Highway 441 (along with State Road 500) joins US 92 at US 192 - thus OBT carries US 17, US 92 and US 441, as well as unsigned SR 500 and SR 600, from Kissimmee to Orlando. Along this stretch, the road intersects the Osceola Parkway in Kissimmee, SR 417 (Central Florida GreeneWay) at exit 11, and the Central Florida Parkway as it passes east of the resort area of Orlando that includes Walt Disney World and affiliated resorts, Sea World, and Universal Studios. OBT then comes to a massive combined interchange with Florida's Turnpike and SR 528 (Beachline Expressway) in Sky Lake. North of this interchange, the road passes west of The Florida Mall and intersects SR 482.

The road reaches an interchange with I-4 in Holden Heights. OBT continues into Orlando and comes to a diamond interchange with SR 408 (East-West Expressway) at exit 9. Orange Blossom Trail bypasses downtown Orlando to the west, meeting State Road 50 (Colonial Drive) northwest of downtown. At SR 50, US 17/92 turns east, while US 441 continues northwest on OBT towards Apopka. US 17, concurrent with SR 50 (and SR 600), meets the south end of Edgewater Drive and crosses Interstate 4 (SR 400) and State Road 527 (Orange Avenue and Magnolia Avenue) before meeting Mills Avenue (State Road 15), where US 17/92 turns north.

Mills Avenue carries State Road 15 on both sides of State Road 50, but is only signed as such to the south, as north of SR 50, it carries US 92 (and unsigned SR 600). It crosses Lake Estelle on the Andrews Causeway before reaching the border between Orlando and Winter Park.

In Winter Park, US 92's name changes to Orlando Avenue. It crosses State Road 527 (Orange Avenue) and State Road 426 (Fairbanks Avenue) and meets the east end of State Road 423 (Lee Road) while bypassing downtown Winter Park to the west. Shortly after crossing into Maitland, it passes under the SunRail tracks (formerly CSX Transportation's "A" Line), and the old road through downtown Winter Park — Park Avenue — merges in from the southeast. US 92 meets the east end of County Road 438A (Lake Avenue), which heads west to Eatonville, and then splits from the old alignment - County Road 427 - near downtown Maitland. It crosses Horatio Avenue (former County Road 436A) and meets the east end of State Road 414 (Maitland Boulevard) before crossing into Seminole County.

In Seminole County, the redevelopment of the 17-92 Community Redevelopment Area is handled by the US 17-92 Community Redevelopment Agency, a component unit of the County government US 92 is a main commercial strip as it heads through Casselberry (where it crosses State Road 436 - Semoran Boulevard at an interchange) and Longwood (where it crosses State Road 434). North of Longwood it meets the north end of State Road 419 and crosses County Road 427 (the old alignment). Lake Mary Boulevard, Airport Boulevard and State Road 417 cross US 92 in southern Sanford, and it meets the west end of County Road 427A. At 25th Street, southwest of downtown Sanford, State Road 46 comes in from the east and turns north for a concurrency near downtown; County Road 46A heads west on 25th Street. 13th Street marks the west end of County Road 415, and at 1st Street the triple concurrency turns west. Before leaving the Sanford City Limits, the routes run over a bridge for a railroad line near the Sanford Amtrak Auto Train station, as well as the nearby SunRail station. The routes leave the concurrency with SR 46 at the north end of County Road 15 (once a branch of State Road 15), and then runs north towards the interchange with Interstate 4 (SR 400) where US 17/92 turns west along the south shore of Lake Monroe (part of the St. Johns River). Just before crossing the river into Volusia County at the west end of the lake, which runs unsigned with SR 15 and SR 600 here) and crosses under at the end of its own bridge across the river (the St. Johns River Veterans Memorial Bridge).

DeBary to Daytona Beach
After crossing the St. Johns River via the C.A. "Bill" Benedict Bridge, US 92 continues north into Volusia County, meeting the west ends of County Road 4162 (in DeBary), County Road 4146, and County Road 4145 (in Orange City). North of Orange City is a trumpet interchange with State Road 472, a four-lane connection to Interstate 4. US 92 then crosses County Road 4116 and meets the south end of State Road 15A, a western bypass of DeLand. US 92 passes through downtown DeLand on Woodland Boulevard, crossing State Road 44 at New York Avenue. The intersection of US 92 and SR 44 does not allow any turns — right or left — and so adjacent city streets are marked for those turns. In northern DeLand, U.S. Highway 92 (SR 600) splits to the east on International Speedway Boulevard, while U.S. Highway 17 (SR 15) continues north. To the west of the split, International Speedway Boulevard is County Road 92, a short connection to State Road 15A that allows traffic on US 92 to bypass downtown DeLand. SR 15A itself rejoins US 17 north of DeLand.

From DeLand to its terminus in Daytona Beach, US 92 carries the local name, International Speedway Boulevard, running through Tiger Bay State Forest then passing a connecting road towards Interstate 4 with a westbound only flyover off-ramp and an eastbound only on-ramp from exit 129. The highway serves as the southern terminus of LPGA Boulevard then has an interchange with Interstate 95 before it passes by the Daytona International Speedway. US 92 passes by other landmarks such as Daytona Beach International Airport and Volusia Mall. US 92 spans the Halifax River and Intracoastal Waterway via the Broadway Bridge before reaching its eastern terminus at SR A1A.

History

US 92 was in the original 1926 plan, connecting Tampa (concurrent with US 41) to US 1 in Daytona Beach. It had been the Dixie Highway Tampa-St. Petersburg Loop from Plant City to Haines City, the West Mainline from Haines City to Orlando, and the East Florida Connector from Orlando to DeLand.

US 92 was signed along the following roads in 1927:
 SR 17 from Tampa to Haines City
 SR 2 from Haines City to Orlando
 SR 3 from Orlando to DeLand
 SR 21 from DeLand to Daytona Beach

When the bypass of downtown Tampa on SR 17 (Hillsborough Avenue) opened in the early 1930s, US 92 and US 41 were rerouted to use it. US 92 turned south from the new road where US 41 turned north, at Nebraska Avenue (former SR 5, probably then a spur of SR 5), and continued to end in downtown Tampa.

A 1942 map shows US 92 extended west along SR 17 and SR 229 to end at US 19 in Dunedin; it was soon truncated back to Tampa.

In the 1945 renumbering, the whole route of US 92 was numbered SR 600, except for the section south to downtown Tampa, which was SR 45. It was extended west and south to downtown St. Petersburg along SR 600 and SR 687 in 1953.

In 1947, the route was extended east in Daytona Beach across the Intracoastal Waterway and the Halifax River after the Broadway Bridge was reconstructed and opened.

In 1961, US 92 was moved to bypass downtown Lakeland, along SR 517 and SR 546. The old route was signed as Business US 92 until 1998.

Until 1999, 92 ran through downtown Kissimmee on Emmett Street, Broadway and Main Street, along with US 17.

In 2006, US 92 (along with US 17) was re-signed to bypass downtown Kissimmee, moving it to US 192 from John Young Parkway to US 441.

In late 2013, the Florida Department of Transportation began an $80 million project to construct a flyover interchange with US 17-92 traveling over SR 436 in Casselberry. This interchange was built to alleviate congestion at one of the busiest intersections in Florida. The flyover interchange was completed on April 6, 2015, with a ribbon-cutting ceremony held.

Major intersections

Special routes

Kissimmee truck route

US 17-92 Truck is an alternate route for US 17-92 in northern Kissimmee, Florida, following John Young Parkway and the Osceola Parkway (CR 522) instead of Vine Street (US 192) and Orange Blossom Trail. It was signed in about 2011 when the single-point urban interchange at John Young and Osceola Parkways was completed.

Maitland truck route

US 17-92 Truck is designated to divert overheight truck traffic away from a low railroad bridge that carries the SunRail rail line over US 17-92 in southern Maitland.

Lakeland business route

U.S. Business Route 92 in Lakeland, Florida was a  business route designed to keep trucks from entering Downtown Lakeland that followed State Road 600 between 1961 and 1998. The route began where US 92 turned north onto SR 517. It runs along George Jenkins Boulevard, then makes a sharp southeast turn along Sloan Avenue, while George Jenkins Boulevard becomes SR 548. Sloan Avenue becomes a divided highway between the  bridge beneath the CSX Lakeland Subdivision, only to emerge at the intersection of West Main Street where it turns east. The road's major intersections include a partial interchange with SR 563, and then SR 37, where West Main Street becomes East Main Street. The road makes a brief left turn onto Massachusetts Avenue in front of Lake Mirror for one block, then turns right at the end of Cedar Street where it runs along the north shore of Lake Mirror passing by Lakeland Amtrak Station. East Main makes a sharp right turn to the south before the intersection of Rose Street, then turns east again at the intersection of East Lake Street. From there it has an intersection with US 98 (SR 548), and after Lake Parker Avenue makes a north turn onto Tyler Road. The road crosses under the CSX Carters Subdivision, this time beneath a  two-lane undivided bridge, and then curves onto East Gary Road, where it runs east until finally ending at US 92 along the south shore of Lake Parker. FDOT maps still show US Bus 92 as an existing route.

References

External links

Endpoints of U.S. Highway 92

 
92
92
92
92
92
92
92
92
92
92
92
92
1926 establishments in Florida